Josh Katz is an American journalist and graphics editor at The New York Times. He is perhaps best known for the dialect quiz he created, which was published in the New York Times and which led to him writing the book Speaking American: How Y’all, Youse , and You Guys Talk. Katz lives in Brooklyn.

Early life and education 
Katz studied philosophy and political science at Drew University then obtained his masters degree in statistics from North Carolina State University and then joined The New York Times in 2013.  He has written numerous articles for The New York Times, where he covers sports, politics, and culture for "The Upshot". "The Upshot" is a section of The New York Times that combines data visualization and journalistic analysis of news.

Works 
Katz's best known work came in 2013 when he was an intern at The New York Times when he created the newspaper's most popular piece of content that year. The article was called "How Y'all, Youse, and You Guys Talk". In it Katz employed an algorithm and statistical analyses on data provided by Harvard University researchers. His book-length extrapolation of the piece, called Speaking American: How Y'all, Youse, and You Guys Talk: A Visual Guide was published three years later. The book takes questions from over 350,000 unique survey responses about pronunciation and word choice to map where people live in America depending on how they speak.

Katz has continued to contribute articles to "The Upshot, including:

 A Close-Up Picture of Partisan Segregation, Among 180 Million Voters"
 "Which Families Will Receive the Most Money From the Stimulus Bill"
 "574,000 More U.S. Deaths Than Normal Since Covid-19 Struck"
 "2020 N.F.L Playoff Picture for Week 17: Mapping All the Scenarios"
 "A Detailed Map of Who Is Wearing Masks in the U.S."
 "In Shadow of Pandemic, U.S. Drug Overdoes Deaths Resurge to Record"

References

External links
 "How Y'all, Youse, and You Guys Talk"
 Slideshow of Katz's visual maps of dialects

Living people
Year of birth missing (living people)
The New York Times people
American male journalists
Drew University alumni
North Carolina State University alumni